Fred Martinelli (February 15, 1929 – May 15, 2021) was an American football player and coach.  He served as head football coach at Ashland University in Ashland, Ohio from 1959 to 1993, compiling a record of 217–119–12.  Martinelli was inducted into the College Football Hall of Fame as a coach in 2002.

Following his graduation from Otterbein College in 1951, Martinelli became the head football coach at Bellville High School in Bellville, Ohio.  At Bellville, he led his football teams to 28–16 record in five seasons and also coached basketball and baseball.  He resigned from Bellville in 1956 to become the head football coach at Bryan High School in Bryan, Ohio.

Head coaching record

College

See also
 List of college football coaches with 200 wins

References

External links
 

1929 births
2021 deaths
Ashland Eagles football coaches
Otterbein Cardinals football players
High school baseball coaches in the United States
High school basketball coaches in Ohio
High school football coaches in Ohio
College Football Hall of Fame inductees
Sportspeople from Columbus, Ohio
Coaches of American football from Ohio
Players of American football from Columbus, Ohio